The JCI Ten Outstanding Young Persons of the World, usually JCI TOYP, program serves to formally recognize young people who excel in their chosen fields and exemplify the best attributes of the world's young people. The program is sponsored by Junior Chamber International (JCI). JCI selects 10 outstanding young people under 40 who live the JCI Mission in extraordinary ways.

It was founded by the 1983 JCI World President Kjell Peterson and first introduced at the 1983 JCI World Congress in Taipei.

Honorees

1980s

1983

1984

1985

1986

1987

1988

1989

1990s

1990

1991

1992

1993

1994

1995

1996

1997

1998

1999

2000s

2000

2001

2002

2003

2004

2005

2006

2007

2008

2009

2010s

2010

2011

2012

2013

2014

2015

2016

2017

2018 

2019

2020

2021

2022

References

Lists of award winners
Junior Chamber International